När ljusen ska tändas därhemma is a Christer Sjögren Christmas album, released to CD and cassette tape before Christmas 1994, and VHS before the 1995 Christmas. At the Swedish album chart it peaked at 25th position.

The song "Min önskejul" was recorded by Sanna Nielsen on her 1997 Christmas album with the same name.

Track listing

Side 1
När ljusen tändas därhemma (When It's Lamp Lighting Time in the Valley)
Ser du stjärnan i det blå (When You Wish upon a Star)
O helga natt (Cantique de noël)
Sjömansjul på Hawaii
Ett barn är fött på denna dag
Julenatt - silvernatt
Blue Christmas

Side 2
Bella Notte
O du saliga, o du heliga (O du fröhliche)
Min önskejul
Vår vackra vita vintervärld (Winter Wonderland)
När det lider mot jul (Det strålar en stjärna)
Vi längtar efter julen
Allt som saknas är du

Contributors
Christer Sjögren: vocals
Peter Ljung: Keyboards
Klas Anderhell: drums
Rutger Gunnarsson: bass
Lasse Westmann: guitar

Charts

References 

1994 Christmas albums
Christmas albums by Swedish artists
Christer Sjögren albums
Pop rock Christmas albums
Swedish-language albums